Kamigo Dam is a concrete gravity dam located in Yamagata Prefecture in Japan. The dam is used for power production. The catchment area of the dam is 1810 km2. The dam impounds about 100  ha of land when full and can store 7660 thousand cubic meters of water. The construction of the dam was started on 1961 and completed in 1962.

References

Dams in Yamagata Prefecture
1962 establishments in Japan